The 2002 VIP Petfoods Queensland 500 was an endurance race for V8 Supercars staged at Queensland Raceway, Ipswich, Queensland, Australia on 15 September 2002. Race distance was 161 laps of the 3.121 km circuit, totalling 502 km. The event was round nine of the 2002 V8 Supercar Championship Series. It was the fourth and last Queensland 500 to be held for V8 Supercars, although the race name was revived in 2006 for a club level endurance race for Sports and Touring Cars.

The 2002 race was won by David Besnard and Simon Wills driving a Ford AU Falcon.

Top Fifteen Shootout
Top Fifteen Shootout results as follows:

Official results

Race results as follows:

Statistics
 Provisional Pole Position – #4 Marcos Ambrose – 1:10.7937
 Pole Position – #4 Marcos Ambrose – 1:10.8726
 Fastest Lap – #51 Greg Murphy – 1:11.7057 – 157 km/h
 Race time of winning car – 03:38:04.2825 – 138 km/h

References

External links
 VIP Petfoods Queensland 500 race results at racing.natsoft.com.au via www.webcitation.org
 www.v8supercar.com.au at 29 September 2002 via web.archive.org
 2002 VIP Petfoods Queensland 500 photos from www.pbase.com

VIP Petfoods Queensland 500
Queensland 500
Pre-Bathurst 500